Nicolás Lorenzo Álvarez Martínez (born 5 September 1963) is a Mexican politician from the Institutional Revolutionary Party. From 2000 to 2003 he served as Deputy of the LVIII Legislature of the Mexican Congress representing Chiapas, and previously served as municipal president of Huixtán.

References

1963 births
Living people
Politicians from Chiapas
Institutional Revolutionary Party politicians
20th-century Mexican politicians
21st-century Mexican politicians
Municipal presidents in Chiapas
Deputies of the LVIII Legislature of Mexico
Members of the Chamber of Deputies (Mexico) for Chiapas